Haris Alagic professionally known as Haris, is a Dutch singer-songwriter and guitarist of Bosnian descent. He started his career in 2013 by winning the fifth season of Dutch series of the X Factor.

Career

X Factor 
Alagic won the Dutch X Factor with 64% from opponent contestant Adriaan Persons when he was eighteen years old. During the television show, Alagic was being coached by Dutch singer, presenter, actress Angela Groothuizen. As a result of this victory, Alagic won a signing with music label Sony Music. During this collaboration with Sony Music, Alagic released his first singles "Playing with Fire", and "Gold". In 2015, his first EP Bedroom Sessions was being released, which he recorded in his bedroom.

After the beginning of Alagic's career, he has been collaborating with various artists. Alagic has worked together as performing vocalist as well as a songwriter with artists such as Hardwell, Headhunterz, The Voyagers, Oliver Heldens, Ferry Corsten, and  Dannic. During this time, Alagic was mostly releasing EDM tracks.

2018–present
Later, Alagic went on with songwriting and releasing his own music. In the meantime, the collaboration between the artist and Sony Music ended and begun publishing music with Houston Comma. In 2018, various singles led to his second EP Side Effects. While Alagic continued with releasing singles, it was the collaboration between him and DJ duo Lucas & Steve, starting with the release of "Perfect" in 2019, which brought him back to public attention. The song was adapted and sampled on the a-ha song "Take On Me". Shortly after, Alagic released the single "Shivers" in 2020. Also in 2020, Alagic worked on another release from Lucas & Steve. This time, he co-wrote and performed "Letters", Lucas & Steve's album Letters to Remember.

Discography

EPs
2015: Bedroom EP
2018: Side Effects EP
2021: Wilted Roses EP
2022: Beauty is a mess EP

Albums
2021: Obsession

Singles
2013: "Playing with Fire" - Peaked at #27 on Dutch Top 40, #9 on Dutch Single Top 100
2013: "Gold"
2020: "Shivers"

Featured in
2019: "Perfect" (Lucas & Steve feat. Haris) - Peaked at #10 on Dutch Top 40 and #28 on Dutch Single Top 100

References

1995 births
Living people
Dutch male singers
The X Factor winners
People from Eindhoven
Dutch people of Bosnia and Herzegovina descent
Dutch guitarists